Persatuan Sepakbola Kota Cimahi is an Indonesian football club based in Cimahi, West Java. They currently compete in the Liga 2. Their nicknames  are Laskar Sangkuriang and Panser Cimahi.

History
PSKC Cimahi was established on 2001 and has become the pride team of the people of Cimahi to this day, since they were first established, they have always been in the lowest-caste of the Indonesian League and have won achievements since the change in the competition format in the 2016 season.

PSKC Cimahi has quite brilliant achievements, they are being the only team that won the Liga 3 West Java zone for three seasons in a row (2017, 2018, 2019). PSKC Cimahi is also the team with the most number of finals in Liga 3 West Java with 4 times reaching the final round, in total, they have managed to enter the final 4 times in the Liga 3 West Java zone, from the 4 finals, PSKC won the Liga 3 West Java zone.

Their best achievement is qualifying for the first time to Liga 2 in the 2020 season since the club was founded, this happened in the 2019 season, after successfully becoming runner-up in the 2019 Liga 3 in a defeat to Persijap Jepara with a score of 1–3.

Support

Supporters
PSKC Cimahi has a group of supporters called Greentroops and Cimahi Football Fans/Cimahi Mania. Greentroops has accompanied PSKC Cimahi since 27 August 2017 in the Liga 3 competition, until finally was promotion to 2020 Liga 2. Under Greentroops itself there are still several more crews or groups, including Ultras Green Boy and Tifosi Cimahi.

Players

Current squad

Coaching staff

Honours 
Liga 3
Runner-up (1): 2019
 Liga 3 West Java Series 1
 Champions (3): 2017, 2018, 2019
 Runner-up (1): 2016

References

External links
 

 Cimahi
Sport in West Java
Football clubs in Indonesia
Football clubs in West Java
Association football clubs established  in 2001
2001 establishments in Indonesia